The Caribbean Cup was the championship tournament for national association football teams that are members of the Caribbean Football Union.

Qualifying tournament

Preliminary round

Group 1

Group 2

Group 3

 Bahamas withdrew meaning that US Virgin Islands progressed.

Qualifying round
Top team in each group and best runner up qualified for finals

Group 1
Played in Guyana

Group 2
Played in Martinique

Group 3
Played in Haiti

Group 4
Played in Antigua and Barbuda ( were scheduled to be hosts but they withdrew)

Group 5
Played in Suriname

Final tournament
Played in Trinidad and Tobago

First round

Group 1

Group 2

Semi-finals

Third-place match

Final

Trinidad & Tobago, Haiti and Martinique qualified automatically for 2002 CONCACAF Gold Cup. Fourth-placed team qualified for home and away playoff against fourth-placed team in UNCAF Nations Cup 2001.

References

Caribbean Cup
Caribbean Cup
Caribbean Cup
International association football competitions hosted by Trinidad and Tobago